Beaufort or Belfort Castle, known locally as Qal'at al-Shaqif or Shaqif Arnun, is a Crusader fortress in Nabatieh Governorate, Southern Lebanon, about  to the south-south-east of the village of Arnoun. There was a fortification on the site before it was captured by Fulk, King of Jerusalem, in 1139 and construction of the Crusader castle probably began soon after. Saladin captured Beaufort in 1190, but 60 years later Crusaders re-took it. In 1268 Sultan Baibars finally captured the castle for the Islamic forces.

Beaufort provides one of the few cases in which a medieval castle proved of military value and utility in modern warfare as well, as its late 20th-century history shows.

Name
The castle was named bel fort or beau fort (French for "beautiful fortress") by the Crusaders who occupied the castle in the 12th century. Its Arabic name Qala'at al-Shaqif means "Castle of the High Rock" (shqif is the Aramaic word for "high rock").

History

Medieval era

The outcrop Beaufort occupied overlooks the Litani River. The river flows past the east side of the castle, which stands atop a  cliff which declines steeply to the river. Little is known of the site prior to its capture by Crusader forces in 1139, as no contemporary documents mention the site before then. However, historians assume that the castle's commanding hilltop site made it a strategic position that was fortified before its capture by the Crusaders. Fulk, King of Jerusalem, captured the fortification of Qal'at al-Shaqif in 1139 and gave the site to the lords of Sidon. Medieval historian Hugh Kennedy speculates that construction of the Crusader castle began soon after Fulk gave the site to the lords of Sidon.

The Battle of Hattin in 1187 saw the Crusaders suffer a crushing defeat at the hands of Saladin. In the aftermath, many castles and cities fell to Saladin's forces so that only a handful of cities remained under the Crusaders' control. Beaufort was one of the last castles to resist Saladin. In April 1189, Saladin was preparing to besiege the castle and Arab sources describe the event in detail. At the time Beaufort was under the control of Reynald of Sidon who had survived the Battle of Hattin, While Saladin was camped at nearby Marjayoun, preparing for the siege, Reynald met him and claimed to have Muslim sympathies. He said that while he would like to hand over control of Beaufort, his family were in the Christian city of Tyre and he could not surrender until they were safely out of the city. In the hope of a taking the castle without any bloodshed, Reynald was given three months to extract his family from Tyre; instead he used this time to repair the castle and stock up on supplies.

After three months Reynald met Saladin again, protesting he needed more time. Saladin insisted he hand over the castle immediately, so Reynald ordered the garrison to surrender. When they refused Reynald was taken prisoner and the siege began. Hostilities lasted until August that year when Saladin was forced to lift the siege to defend Acre. In April 1190 an agreement was reached where the castle's garrison would hand over control to Saladin in return for Reynald's release. The castle came under Crusader control in 1240 as part of a treaty negotiated by Theobald I of Navarre. It was sold to the Knights Templar by Reginald's grandson, Julian of Sidon, in 1260. In 1268, the Mamluke Sultan Baibars captured the castle, and there was relative calm through the 14th, 15th, and 16th centuries.

Modern era

After the Ottoman conquest of Syria in 1516, the Ottomans attempted to revive the area by granting military benefices (timar) to Ottoman cavalry soldiers around Shaqif Arnun castle. The Shiite Sa'b family held the castles on the Ottomans behalf as early as 1571. In the early 17th century Fakhr-al-Din II took the castle as a part of his network of fortifications. Fakhr-al-Din II was defeated by the Ottomans, who destroyed the upper portions of the castle. Thereafter it was reinvested by the Sa'bs. The area was ruled by Shiite feudal families until 1769. In 1782 the Governor of Acre, Jazzar Pasha, besieged the castle, captured it and destroyed many of its remaining fortifications. The Galilee earthquake of 1837 caused further damage to the structure and from then on the ruins were used as a quarry and a shelter for sheep. The late 19th century saw the start of study of Beaufort Castle, with surveys by Victor Guérin in 1880 and Claude Reignier Conder and Herbert Kitchener in 1881 as part of the Survey of Western Palestine.

T E Lawrence visited the castle in 1909 during his walk across modern-day Lebanon and Syria, conducting research for his thesis. He was particularly struck by the view of the coast and along the Litani River.

In 1921 the French Mandate was established and French historians and archaeologists investigated the region's history and structures. The medieval historian  began studying Crusader castles in the 1927 and his work influenced subsequent generations of historians of the Crusades. In 1936, seven years after he first visited Beaufort, Deschamps and architect Pierre Coupel organised 65 soldiers to clear Beaufort's inner enclosure and the keep. Kennedy highlights Deschamps' La Défense du Royaume de Jerusalem (1939) as a particularly important source in the study of Beaufort as "his descriptions and plans record a building which has probably been mutilated beyond recognition by recent military activity". The French Mandate ended in 1943 when Lebanon became independent.

The castle's strategic location, which affords a view of much of southern Lebanon and northern Israel, has caused it to be a focus for recent conflicts. The Palestine Liberation Organization (PLO) held the castle from 1976 onwards, during the Lebanese Civil War and consequentially it was attacked dozens of times by Israeli forces in the space of five years. On 6 June 1982, at the start of Operation Peace for Galilee (the 1982 Lebanon War), the PLO position on Beaufort Castle was heavily shelled by the Israelis before it was captured by the Israeli forces two days later in the Battle of the Beaufort. The fighting caused damage to the castle, and in the aftermath the Israeli army adapted the site for their own use by building a large forward operations base adjacent to the fort's western wall - as a result of prior presence of PLO and the fear of IEDs, Israeli soldiers manning the base were allowed to tour the upper floors of the fortress but prevented from accessing the lower parts. In 2000 the Israeli army left Beaufort, altogether demolishing the base. The IDF occupation of Beaufort provides the basis of the Israeli film Beaufort, although the film itself was shot on the Golan Heights. After the Israeli withdrawal attempts by local tourism services to restore the fort began, albeit in very slow progress and lack of funding.

Construction
Several of the great Crusader castles were built on spurs, using natural defences and fortifying the one access point. The setting of Beaufort plays a role in the defence of the site, but the terrain is only impassable on the north side. The Kurds extended the castle to include a slightly lower shelf of rock immediately to the east of the castle, thereby removing one of the routes of attack. While it was common for keeps in Europe to be entered through the first floor, in Syria the convention was for a ground floor entrance as can be seen at Beaufort.

References

Notes

Bibliography

Further reading

 , London, ( p. 534  & p. 535)
 

Castles in Lebanon
Castles and fortifications of the Kingdom of Jerusalem
Nabatieh Governorate
Tourist attractions in Lebanon
Castles and fortifications of the Knights Templar